John Hatch (born 4 January 1947 in Colonia Juárez, Chihuahua) is a Mexican former basketball player who competed in the 1968 Summer Olympics. He is the nephew of Gayle Bluth, who represented Mexico at the 1960 Summer Olympics in  basketball.

References

1947 births
Living people
Basketball players at the 1967 Pan American Games
Basketball players at the 1968 Summer Olympics
Basketball players from Chihuahua
Mexican men's basketball players
Olympic basketball players of Mexico
Pan American Games silver medalists for Mexico
People from Colonia Juárez, Chihuahua
Pan American Games medalists in basketball
Medalists at the 1967 Pan American Games